This 15 Me is the promotional world tour for Sarah Geronimo's thirteenth studio album of the same name. It also celebrates Geronimo's fifteenth year in the showbiz industry. She kicked off the tour in Manila which set the record for Highest Grossing Local Concert held in Smart Araneta Coliseum in history. Netflix acquired the rights to stream the concert film starting in August 2019 making Geronimo the first Southeast Asian artist to have a concert film on the said platform. Part of the show's setlist are the songs from the album, "Sandata" "Ganito" and "Duyan." BPO company Convergys bought the Cebu show as part of their Made by You 15th anniversary concert series. On other tour stops, the show was called "Sarah G Live! This 15 Me" or simply "Sarah G Live!"

Development 
The tour is in celebration of Geronimo's 15th year in showbiz industry which started in 2002 when she joined and later won the television singing contest Star for A Night that led to more success for Geronimo throughout her career. The concert was announced on February 1, 2018 prior to the surprise release of her thirteenth full-length album of the same name. Other concert dates were announced on the night of Manila show.

Background 
James Reid, Xian Lim, Billy Crawford, Mark Bautista and Daniel Padilla performed with Geronimo at her three-hour show. Ronnie Liang and Sam Concepcion joined her on succeeding shows in the Philippines and abroad. During the Manila show, Geronimo's fans called "Popsters" filled the arena with red lights as a surprise for Geronimo. Geronimo herself was the first local artist to achieve this feat during her 2015 concert From the Top. D

Reception 
Despite having less promotion, the concert managed to set a new record for Geronimo. As an addition to her record as the youngest solo artist to hold a show in Smart Araneta at the age of 16, Geronimo with her This 15 Me Concert broke the record for the Highest Grossing Local Concert in History. The hashtag #SarahGeronioThis15MeConcert trended on Twitter Philippines at number one on the day of the concert with over 200,000 tweets. Various recorded performances from the said show also landed on YouTube Philippines trends including her performances for Dulo, Tala, I Have Nothing and I Don't Wanna Miss A Thing while her take for the dance challenge Dame tu Cosita went viral on social media platforms Facebook and Twitter.

Critical Reception

Manila 
Writing for ABS-CBN News, Sheila Reyes said that there was never a dull moment during the show and the momentum was kept up throughout the night. Allan Policarpio of Inquirer.net praised Geronimo's birit-medley number saying "Just because she doesn’t do it as much doesn’t mean she can’t handle big diva songs anymore. She sounded solid in Natural Woman And in I Have Nothing." "Sarah proves (as if we had any doubt) that she's the country's popstar princess" Rappler.com said.

Dubai 
Chris Newbould from The National reviewed the show, praising Geronimo's talent and despising the event's support acts and commercialism probably due to Geronimo's constant pauses to thank the myriad sponsors and producer, "Geronimo rescues a strange evening" Newbould said. He also shared his disappointment on Geronimo not singing her songs from the film Miss Granny which was recently shown in Dubai.

Netflix Film 
Streaming platform Netflix acquired the rights to screen the concert film which was recorded in Manila. The rockumentary was tagged as Netflix Originals, making Geronimo the first Asian artist to have an original concert film available for streaming on the said platform. It became available on August 23, 2019. The show is Directed by long time creative collaborator of Sarah, Director Paul Alexei Basinillo

Setlist 

 "Dulo"
 "Pray For Me"
 "All The Stars"
 "Wolves"
 "Scared to Be Lonely"
 "Tala"
 "The Greatest Performance of My Life"
 "This Is My Life"
 "To Love You More"
 "Can This Be Love" (background only)
 "Broken Vow" with Mark Bautista
 "How Could You Say You Love Me"
 "Sa Iyo" (snippet only)
 "Record Breaker" (snippet only)
 "Love Me Like You Do" with Xian Lim
 "Chunky" with James Reid
 "Misteryo"
 "Duyan"
 "The Way Love Goes"
 "A Woman's Worth"
 "Skinny Love"
 "Dive"
 "I Put A Spell On You"
 "Natural Woman"
 "I Have Nothing"
 "Ganito"
 "The Great Unknown"
 "Misty"
 "Quando Quando" with Daniel Padilla
 "The Way You Look Tonight" with Daniel Padilla
 "Hold On, We're Going Home"
 "Dare You To Move"
 "Sandata"
 "Ikot-Ikot"

Encore 

 "Leaving On A Jet Plane"
 "I Don't Wanna Miss A Thing"
 "Kilometro"

Tour Dates

References 

2018 concert tours